Marler is an English surname. Notable people with the surname include:

 George Carlyle Marler (1901-1981), Canadian politician
 Herbert Meredith Marler (1876-1940), Canadian politician and diplomat
 Joe Marler (born 1990), English Rugby union player
 Seth Marler (born 1981), American football placekicker
 Taryn Marler (born 1988), Australian actress

People with surnames that are cognates of Marler include:

 Robin Marlar, English cricketer and cricket journalist
 John Marlor, English-American architect 

Fictional characters:
 Blake Marler, character on the television program Guiding Light
 Dinah Marler, character on the television program Guiding Light

See also
 William F. Marlar Memorial Foundation
 Marlers

English-language surnames